The 2017 FC Ukraine United season was the second season in the club's participation in the Canadian Soccer League. They began the season at home against FC Vorkuta B. They achieved their first CSL double after defeating Burlington SC in the finals, and became the second club in the Second Division after TFC Academy II in 2012 to go undefeated the entire regular season.

Summary 
After a successful debut season in the CSL the organization decided to relegate themselves to the CSL Second Division for the 2017 season. Andrei Malychenkov continued in his capacity as head coach, and brought further seasoned imports from the Ukraine. Throughout the season the club achieved a club milestone by producing their first perfect season in the league. As well as generating the best offensive and defensive record. In the first round of the postseason they defeated Brantford Galaxy B, and claimed the Second Division Championship after defeating Burlington SC.

Players

Roster

Management

Competitions

Canadian Soccer League

League table

Second Division

Results summary

Results by round

Matches

Statistics

Goals 
Correct as of November 10, 2017

References

FC Ukraine United
FC Ukraine United
FC Ukraine United